The 1999–2000 New York Islanders season was the 28th season in the franchise's history. In this season, the Islanders slipped to last place in the Atlantic Division, and 13th overall in the Eastern Conference, to miss the Stanley Cup playoffs for the sixth consecutive year.

Off-season
Captain Trevor Linden was traded to the Montreal Canadiens; defenseman Kenny Jonsson was named his replacement as captain.

Regular season
The Islanders had the most power-play opportunities against during the regular season, with 420, and allowed the most power-play goals, with 84.

On March 2, 2000, the Islanders scored three short-handed goals in a 5–5 tie with the Ottawa Senators.

Final standings

Schedule and results

Player statistics

Regular season
Scoring

Goaltending

Awards and records

Transactions

Draft picks
New York's draft picks at the 1999 NHL Entry Draft held at the FleetCenter in Boston, Massachusetts.

See also
 1999–2000 NHL season

References
 

New York Islanders seasons
New York Islanders
New York Islanders
New York Islanders
New York Islanders